For the radio programme see The State We're In (radio program)

The State We're In is rock band The Dogs D'Amour's debut studio album, released in 1984. The album was produced in Finland and released on Finnish label Kumibeat Records. It was re-released in 2003, with a mix different from the one released in '84 (Tyla did not like the keyboards the producer overdubbed on the original mix, against the band's will).

Only one track was released as a single; "How Do You Fall In Love Again?", it also spawned the band's first ever promotional video. Three of the tracks would be later recorded for studio releases; "The State I'm In" was re-recorded for In the Dynamite Jet Saloon (1988), "How Do You Fall In Love Again" was re-recorded for the Kids From Kensington EP (1988) and then "Heroine" was re-recorded for "Straight??!!" (1990).

In December 2014, Strata Books website published a memoir written by Tyla about the making of The State We're In.

Track listing
 "Wired and Wide Awake"  	
 "Don't Ask Me to Say I Love You"	
 "Unconscious Boy"  	
 "Girl in Black"  	
 "Heroine"  	
 "All About You"  	
 "Dole Hero"  	
 "Can't Get You Out of My Head"  	
 "How Do You Fall in Love Again?"  	
 "The State I'm In"

Band
Tyla - guitar, lead vocals
Dave Kusworth - guitars, vocals
Karl Watson - bass
Paul Hornby - drums

Singles
 How Do You Fall In Love Again? (1984)

1984 debut albums
The Dogs D'Amour albums